Gmina Siekierczyn is a rural gmina (administrative district) in Lubań County, Lower Silesian Voivodeship, in south-western Poland.

Neighbouring gminas
Gmina Siekierczyn is bordered by the town of Lubań and the gminas of Lubań, Platerówka, Sulików and Zgorzelec.

Villages
The gmina contains the villages of Nowa Karczma, Pisaczów, Ponikowo, Rudzica, Siekierczyn, Wesołówka, Wyręba and Zaręba.

Twin towns – sister cities

Gmina Siekierczyn is twinned with:
 Frýdlant, Czech Republic

References

External links
Local website

Siekierczyn
Lubań County